Joker Xue (born 17 July 1983) is a Chinese singer-songwriter and record producer.

Formerly known as Jacky Xue, Xue is known for his hit songs and stage charisma with his signature musical style. Since his 2006 debut, Xue has produced a string of hits detailing love's triumphs and woes. His musical style melds the classic pop pairing of piano and strings with folk-tinged acoustic guitar and R&B beats. He is among the most-streamed Mandopop artists on Spotify.

Music career
In 2006, Xue released his self-titled debut album "薛之谦" Xue Zhiqian as Jacky Xue. That year he was awarded the Most Popular New Artist at the 6th Global Chinese Music Awards. The album was a success and brought about a few major hits, such as "认真的雪" Serious Snow, "黄色枫叶" Yellow Maple.

In 2007, Xue recorded his second album "你过得好吗" How Are You, and was nominated for seven categories at the Beijing Pop Music Awards, which established his reputation as a promising singer-songwriter in his early career.

In 2008, Xue released his third album "深深爱过你" Loved You Deeply. After listening to the song "传说" Legend in this album, Shinji Tanimura 谷村新司 was very impressed by Xue's compositions and invited him to the Asia Music Festival held in Osaka, Japan. On 25 July, Xue was honored as a torchbearer for the 2008 Summer Olympics torch relay.

In 2009, Xue released a compilation album "未完成的歌" Uncompleted Songs, which lists selected tracks from several of his albums, along with three new songs.

In 2012, his fifth album was released, "几个薛之谦" Several of Xue Zhiqian. It marked the end of his seven-year contract with "上腾娱乐" Shangteng Entertainment, which went out of business soon after he left.

In 2013, Xue released his sixth album "意外" An Unexpected Journey, under the record company Ocean Butterflies. Notable songs include "丑八怪" Ugly and "你还要我怎样" What Do You Want Me To Do, which have over 70 million and 35 million views on YouTube, respectively.

In 2015, Xue released an EP, "绅士" Gentleman, which contains three tracks, including the highly popular song "演员" Actor. The music video for "演员" has been viewed over 180 million times on YouTube.

In 2016, Xue produced his seventh album "初学者" Beginner, which includes three songs from the EP "绅士" of the previous year and the notable single "剛剛好" Just Right. The music video for "剛剛好" has over 50 million views on YouTube.

In 2017, Xue released his eighth album "渡" The Crossing. Songs favored by critics from this album include “高尚” Noble and “动物世界” Animal World. In the same year, Xue held his concert tour "我好像在哪儿见过你" I Think I've Seen You Somewhere.

In 2018, Xue released his ninth album "摩天大楼" Skyscraper. In this album, songs like “摩天大楼” Skyscraper and “肆无忌惮” Reckless incorporates different musical elements, while “最好” The Best features a more balladic composition. In the same year, he started his "摩天大楼" Skyscraper World Tour.

In 2019, Xue released his tenth album "尘" Dust, which contains ten songs. The song "木偶人" has won a prize on a grand music ceremony hold by Migu Music.

In 2020, Xue released his eleventh album "天外来物" Alien From The Sky, which contains nine songs. Prior to the album's release, he released a series of singles which includes all songs on the album but one, "潘金蓮".

Early life 
Xue was born and grew up in Shanghai, China. At four years old, his mother died of a heart disease. He studied painting in his youth, then Hotel Management at Glion Institute of Higher Education in Switzerland, before dropping out to pursue a music career.

Career

Early career 
Xue started his music career in 2006, releasing several albums up until the year 2009.

In 2010, the boss of his company was not willing to publish Xue's album, despite it being an original creation, and Xue's team was dismissed as a result. However, Xue afforded all the expenditure to publish and advertise his album, wishing to continue his musical career. He began to find styling designers, dressers, and professional publishers to continue his career. During this period, he fell into depression, and lost weight sharply during those days. In a reality show, Xue needed to introduce himself to others in the universities and on the street, but no one knew him, and he was rejected to answer any questions. Finally, he was expelled, and said that he "cannot complete the mission today." In the following three years, Xue was diagnosed with Major Depressive Disorder, reporting that he felt suicidal and need a large dose of medication to help with his insomnia. He finally decided to sell his apartment and run a hot pot restaurant to earn more money to continue pursuing music.

After earning some money, he spent it on advertisements for his album in order to push his image into fame. Xue also played some roles in crews or appeared in reality shows. In April 2012, he told journalists that he encouraged himself not to give up at pursuing his music dream, and that all the things he has done may seem crazy, but he did it to pretend that he was fine. He changed his English name from "Jacky" to "Joker" as a result.

Reintroduction to fame 
Before 2016, Xue's image was a comedian appearing in many reality shows. For example, he was asked to eat lipstick, glasses, paper, and centipedes. He was also asked to open a durian using his bare hands or his head during one such show. However, in order to keep pursuing his dream of being a popular singer, he changed his image, sold clothes online, and sold his apartment to run a restaurant.

In an interview, when asked why he became a comedian, he answered that he was unwilling to but did it regardless to earn money so that he could pursue his career in music. Xue has also said that "If I go to more reality shows, I will definitely go insane, but appearing on these reality shows and acting like a crazy man have given me two things: making money for creating new songs and keeping exposure during the time when no new music production is published." Due to the music industry being more of a public service benefit in China, Xue has said that it was much harder to work and to earn a liveable wage in the career.

In 2017, Xue made business travels and recorded videos during the daytime and musical creations during midnight, writing on Sina Weibo in his car on the way to work. He said he was underweight and suffered from anxiety, which he claimed only let him sleep for 5 hours at a time. During this time, he returned back to his home three times, could only meet his father seven times in a year, and could not accompany his grandmother when she died, only able to talk to his grandmother through his psychologist.

Social activities 
In 2007, Joker Xue went to Russia with other artists to participate in the China Cultural Festival key project "Friendship Tour along the Volga River" jointly organized by the Ministry of Culture of the People's Republic of China and the Russian Federation Cultural Film Agency.

On 20 January 2008, Joker Xue presented the "Wings of Happiness" charity evening; then, he was elected torchbearer and passed the torch in Zhengzhou, Henan Province, and passed the torch. In March, a new book release was held in Shanghai. Not only donating part of the manuscript fee, he also took out 10 photos for auction. The proceeds were donated to the snow disaster-stricken area through the Shanghai Red Cross to support the reconstruction.

Discography
Extended plays:
 (2015.06) Gentleman (绅士)

Albums:
 (2006.06) Jacky (薛之謙)
 (2007.07) How Are You? (你過得好嗎)
 (2008.11) Unfinished Songs (未完成的歌)
 (2012.08) Several Of... (幾個薛之謙)
 (2013.11) An Unexpected Journey (意外)
 (2016.07) Beginner (初學者)
 (2017.12) The Crossing (渡)
 (2018.12) Joker (怪咖)
 (2019.12) Dust (塵)
 (2020.12) Alien From The Sky (天外來物)
 (2022.09) Countless（无数）

References

External links

 薛之谦 - B站 / Bilibili / 哔哩哔哩

 薛之谦 - Douyin / 抖音 

 薛之谦 - Weibo

 xuezhiqian - Instagram

 Joker Xue - Spotify

1983 births
Living people
Chinese Mandopop singers
Singers from Shanghai
21st-century Chinese male actors
Chinese record producers
Mandopop singer-songwriters
21st-century Chinese male singers